Tadashima Akiyama, also called , was a Japanese samurai of the Azuchi–Momoyama period who hailed from Tajima Province. A rather unknown figure, he is largely remembered for his defeat at the hands of the young Miyamoto Musashi, who was sixteen at the time. It has been concluded that Akiyama openly challenged Musashi.

Musashi wrote in The Book of Five Rings: "When I was sixteen I struck down an able strategist Tadashima Akiyama".

References
Toyota Masataka. "Niten Ki (A Chronicle of Two Heavens)," in Gorin no Sho, edited by Kamiko Tadashi. Tokyo: Tokuma-shoten, 1963.

Further reading
 
 
 
 
 
 

Samurai
Year of death unknown
Year of birth unknown